The 2012 Malaysia Open Grand Prix Gold was the fourth grand prix gold and grand prix tournament of the 2012 BWF Grand Prix Gold and Grand Prix. The tournament was held in Stadium Bandaraya, Johor Bahru, Malaysia from 2 until 6 May 2012 and had a total purse of $120,000.

Men's singles

Seeds

  Lee Chong Wei (champion)
  Nguyen Tien Minh (third round)
  Tommy Sugiarto (semi-final)
  Daren Liew (third round)
  Takuma Ueda (quarter-final)
  Muhammad Hafiz Hashim (semi-final)
  Sourabh Varma (quarter-final)
  Chong Wei Feng (quarter-final)

Finals

Top half

Section 1

Section 2

Section 3

Section 4

Bottom half

Section 5

Section 6

Section 7

Section 8

Women's singles

Seeds

  P. V. Sindhu (semi-final)
  Minatsu Mitani (second round)
  Chan Tsz Ka (quarter-final)
  Aprilia Yuswandari (quarter-final)

Finals

Top half

Section 1

Section 2

Bottom half

Section 3

Section 4

Men's doubles

Seeds

  Koo Kien Keat / Tan Boon Heong (champion)
  Markis Kido / Hendra Setiawan (withdrew)
  Goh V Shem / Lim Khim Wah (second round)
  Yoshiteru Hirobe / Kenta Kazuno (first round)
  Cho Gun-woo / Kang Ji-wook (withdrew)
  Markus Fernaldi Gideon / Agripinna Prima Rahmanto Putra (second round)
  Yohanes Rendy Sugiarto / Afiat Yuris Wirawan (second round)
  Mohd Lutfi Zaim Abdul Khalid / Vountus Indra Mawan (quarter-final)

Finals

Top half

Section 1

Section 2

Bottom half

Section 3

Section 4

Women's doubles

Seeds

  Shinta Mulia Sari / Yao Lei (final)
  Chin Eei Hui / Wong Pei Tty (champion)
  Vivian Hoo Kah Mun / Woon Khe Wei (second round)
  Suci Rizki Andini / Della Destiara Haris (second round)

Finals

Top half

Section 1

Section 2

Bottom half

Section 3

Section 4

Mixed doubles

Seeds

  Chan Peng Soon / Goh Liu Ying (champion)
  Danny Bawa Chrisnanta / Vanessa Neo (semi-final)
  Wong Wai Hong / Chau Hoi Wah (second round)
  Tan Aik Quan / Lai Pei Jing (second round)

Finals

Top half

Section 1

Section 2

Bottom half

Section 3

Section 4

References

Malaysia Masters
Malaysia
Malaysia Open Grand Prix Gold
Sport in Johor
Johor Bahru